In Vajrayana Buddhism, the Womb Realm (Traditional Chinese: 胎蔵界; Pinyin: Tāizāngjiè; Rōmaji: taizōkai) is the metaphysical space inhabited by the Five Compassion Buddhas. The Womb Realm is based on the Mahavairocana Tantra. The name of the mandala derives from chapter 2 of the sutra, where it is said that the buddha Mahāvairocana revealed the mandala's secret teachings to his disciple Vajrasattva from his "womb of compassion".  In other translations, the term Matrix Realm or Matrix Mandala are used.

The Womb Realm is a very popular subject for mandalas, and along with the Diamond Realm (vajradhātu) Mandala forms the Mandala of the Two Realms.  This mandala, along with the Diamond Realm, form the core of Chinese Tangmi and Japanese Tendai and Shingon Buddhist rituals, including abhisheka "initiation". In this ritual, new initiates are blindfolded and asked to toss a flower upon a mandala.  Where the flower lands helps decide which Buddhist figure the student should devote themselves to.

In traditional Tangmi and Shingon halls, the Womb Realm Mandala is hung on the east wall, symbolizing the young stage of Mahāvairocana. In this setting, the Diamond Realm Mandala is hung on the west wall symbolizing the final realization of Mahāvairocana.

Womb Realm map 

Center Eight Petal Hall

Vairocana is depicted in regal attire wearing a jewelled crown in the center of an eight-petaled lotus. Four Buddhas, representing the four directions, are depicted directly above, below, left, and right of Vairocana. The Buddha of the East, Ratnaketu, is illustrated on the top, the Buddha of the South, Samkusumita-raja to the right, the Buddha of the West, Amitabha, to the bottom, and the Buddha of the North, Divyadundubhimeganirghoṣa (Amoghasiddhi), to the Left. Four bodhisattvas, Samantabhadra, Manjushri, Guanyin, and Maitreya, are illustrated between the Buddhas, clockwise.

Vajras are illustrated between the petals of nine deities and symbolize the knowledge or wisdom (jnana) that crush illusions.

Four vases containing a lotus and a three-pronged Vajra, are placed at the corners of the Center Hall. The hall is marked off by a five-colored boundary path with each color referring to one of the five buddhas, knowledges, directions, roots, conversions, syllables, elements, and forms.

See also 
Garbha
Dhatu
Vajradhatu

References

Further reading

External links 
Mandala of the Womb World Japan, Kamakura period, 13th - 14th century Dharmapala Thangka Centre
The Diamond and Womb World Mandalas Dharmapala Thangka Centre
Flying Mountains and Walkers of Emptiness: Toward a Definition of Sacred Space in Japanese Religions History of religions 1982

Buddhist philosophical concepts
Shingon Buddhism